The 1952 Omloop Het Volk was the eighth edition of the Omloop Het Volk cycle race and was held on 9 March 1952. The race started and finished in Ghent. The race was won by Ernest Sterckx.

General classification

References

1952
Omloop Het Nieuwsblad
Omloop Het Nieuwsblad